Kate Comer is an American actress.

Career
Comer grew up in Sarasota, Florida, where she was involved with community theatre. As a teenager, she became obsessed with movies such as Trainspotting, Donnie Darko and Pretty in Pink. She was also inspired by African-American characters like Angela Moore from Boy Meets World. She studied at the Howey Acting Studio which she credits as having "allowed and encouraged [her] to be [herself] 100%". She joined the cast of New Warriors as the character Debrii on Freeform. The show was dropped by Freeform before being cancelled. Despite this, Comer maintains a close friendship with her cast mates.

Filmography

References

External links

Living people
American television actresses
Actresses from Florida
African-American actresses
Actors from Sarasota, Florida
21st-century American actresses
Year of birth missing (living people)
21st-century African-American women
21st-century African-American people